KFNL-FM (104.3 MHz, "Fun 104") is a radio station licensed to Spring Valley, Minnesota, serving the Rochester, Minnesota, area. KFNL-FM airs a classic hits format and is owned by Townsquare Media Rochester License, LLC.

On September 26, 2019, after three days of stunting, KVGO shifted their format from oldies (as "Cool 104") to classic hits, branded as "Fun 104.3". On October 3, 2019, KVGO changed call letters to KFNL-FM.</ref>

Previous logo

References

External links
KFNL's official website

Classic hits radio stations in the United States
Radio stations in Minnesota
Townsquare Media radio stations
Radio stations established in 1994
1994 establishments in Minnesota